In geometry, an 8-simplex is a self-dual regular 8-polytope. It has 9 vertices, 36 edges, 84 triangle faces, 126 tetrahedral cells, 126 5-cell 4-faces, 84 5-simplex 5-faces, 36 6-simplex 6-faces, and 9 7-simplex 7-faces. Its dihedral angle is cos−1(1/8), or approximately 82.82°.

It can also be called an enneazetton, or ennea-8-tope, as a 9-facetted polytope in eight-dimensions. The name enneazetton is derived from ennea for nine facets in Greek and -zetta for having seven-dimensional facets, and -on.

As a configuration
This configuration matrix represents the 8-simplex. The rows and columns correspond to vertices, edges, faces, cells, 4-faces, 5-faces, 6-faces and 7-faces. The diagonal numbers say how many of each element occur in the whole 8-simplex. The nondiagonal numbers say how many of the column's element occur in or at the row's element. This self-dual simplex's matrix is identical to its 180 degree rotation.

Coordinates 

The Cartesian coordinates of the vertices of an origin-centered regular enneazetton having edge length 2 are:

More simply, the vertices of the 8-simplex can be positioned in 9-space as permutations of (0,0,0,0,0,0,0,0,1). This construction is based on facets of the 9-orthoplex.

Another origin-centered construction uses (1,1,1,1,1,1,1,1)/3  and permutations of (1,1,1,1,1,1,1,-11)/12 for edge length √2.

Images

Related polytopes and honeycombs

This polytope is a facet in the uniform tessellations: 251, and 521 with respective Coxeter-Dynkin diagrams:
, 

This polytope is one of 135 uniform 8-polytopes with A8 symmetry.

References 

 Coxeter, H.S.M.: 
 
 
 (Paper 22) 
 (Paper 23) 
 (Paper 24)

External links 
 
 Polytopes of Various Dimensions
 Multi-dimensional Glossary

8-polytopes